The Soviet Military Cemetery in Warsaw, Poland, is the burial place of over 21,000 Soviet soldiers who died fighting against Nazi Germany. It is the largest Soviet war cemetery in Poland and contains one of the first major monuments to be built in Warsaw to those who fought in the Second World War. It is an example of socialist realist architecture.

Inception

The cemetery was built in 1949–1950, located in Warsaw's Mokotów district. It contains the ashes of 21,668 soldiers of the 1st Byelorussian Front who died either in battle or as a result of injury and/or disease sustained during battles for Warsaw against armies of the Third Reich in 1944–1945. Their ashes were exhumed from local cemeteries and transferred to the mausoleum in 1949. The necropolis was designed by architects Bohdan Lachert (who planned the general layout) and Władysław Niemirski (who worked on the greenery), whereas its monumental sculptures were made by Jerzy Jarnuszkiewicz and Stanisław Lisowski.

The mausoleum was opened on the 5th Victory Day (9 May 1950), which since 2015 is celebrated in Poland on 8 May instead of the previously used date of 9 May. Troops from the following formations of the 1st Byelorussian Front are buried here:
 8th Guards Army
 28th, 47th, 48th, 65th, 69th, 70th Armies
 2nd Guards Tank Army
 6th and 16th Air Army
 46th Marksmen Corps
 2nd and 7th Cavalry Corps
 1st Guards Tank Army

Architecture

The Soviet Military Cemetery was constructed in a socialist realist style, which was common in countries of the Warsaw Pact at the time. This can be seen in Jarnuszkiewicz and Lisowski's sculptures of Red Army soldiers as well as reliefs showing workers with tools and other civilians greeting victorious soldiers near the main entrance to the complex. Ashes of the soldiers were buried in 834 graves, 294 of which are individual graves while the other 540 are mass graves. The central part of the cemetery is a wide avenue that leads through three terraces to a 35 metre tall granite obelisk. The obelisk inscription used to read:

"Ku wiecznej chwale bohaterskich żołnierzy niezwyciężonej Armii Radzieckiej, poległych w bojach z hitlerowskim najeźdźcą o wyzwolenie Polski i naszej stolicy Warszawy." (Polish)
"To the eternal glory of heroic soldiers of the invincible Soviet Army, fallen in battles with the Hitlerite invader for the liberation of Poland and our capital Warsaw."

However, it was changed in 2015 to:

"Pamięci żołnierzy Armii Radzieckiej poległych o wyzwolenie Polski spod okupacji niemieckiej w latach 1944–1945." (Polish)
"To the memory of Soviet Army soldiers fallen in liberating Poland from German occupation in the years 1944–1945."

The cemetery dedication on the right side lists (in Polish) the units to which the dead belonged. The same dedication appears on the left, in Russian, along with another relief. The cemetery is surrounded by artistically composed greenery, the work of Władysław Niemirski, as well as a park.

Vandalism in the 2010s
In 2010, the cemetery was vandalised with graffiti sprayed on the base of some of the sculptures that in Polish said: "Tusk we want the truth about Smolensk"; the text addressed then Prime Minister of Poland Donald Tusk, referring to conspiracy theories surrounding the Smolensk air disaster that claimed the crash was an assassination of Polish government officials by the Russian authorities and that Tusk was apparently involved in covering it up.

In March of 2017, the necropolis was vandalised again, this time by three unidentified people who left 15 instances of stencil graffiti around the complex; the graffiti showed a swastika on top of an Israeli flag with two red footprints on each side. The Russian Embassy as well as Poland's Ministry of Foreign Affairs and Ministry of Culture and National Heritage commented on the matter. Police began to guard the Soviet Military Cemetery as a result.

In September of 2017, bases of the sculptures were yet again vandalised, this time sprayed with political slogans in Polish: "Death to traitors of the nation", "Paszoł won from our country", and "Stalin's flunkeys". Police stated that it was likely that the perpetrators committed the acts of vandalism on the 78th anniversary of the Soviet invasion of Poland.

Notes

References

External links
 

Cemeteries in Warsaw
World War II cemeteries in Poland
Religion in Warsaw
Soviet military memorials and cemeteries in Poland
Poland–Soviet Union relations
Mokotów